() is a vulgar Portuguese-language word with a variety of meanings and uses.

However, cognates have not been identified in other Iberian languages including Basque.

Records show that the word has been in use since the 10th century in Portugal, appearing on the "poems of insult and mockery" in the Galician-Portuguese lyric. After the Counter-Reformation, the word became obscene and its original sense meaning the erect penis became less common. Nowadays,  is commonly used as a dysphemism and in erotism. The word is also used in the abbreviation form of "crl".

Etymology
On the basis of both semantics and historical phonology, the most plausible source appears to be unattested Vulgar Latin , which would have been a Latinized diminutive of Ancient Greek  ("stick"). Another possibility is Late Latin  or its diminutive,  ("empty"), eventually used to describe a crow's nest on a ship.

Philologist and Romanist Joan Coromines suggested that the word may have a Pre-Roman origin in the Celtic root .

Etymologist Christian Schmitt proposed that the etymon is Ancient Greek  ("nut").

History

In the 10th century, the word was commonly used to name mounts that had a phallic shape. In 982, King Lothair of France donated land to the same monastery: . 

A vulgar Galician-language poem from the mid-13th century, by Castilian trovador Pedro Burgalês, uses the word in reference to a woman named Maria Negra, who had a strong desire for the phallus:

 
Galician-Portuguese poet Martin Soares mentions an anti-hero named Dom Caralhote (a parody of Lancelot) who is kidnapped and locked for life by a damsel he once dishonored:

See also

 Portuguese profanity
 
 
 Cargados Carajos, islands on the Indian Ocean

References

Bibliography
 
 
 
 
 
 
 
 
 
 
 
 
 
 
 
 
 
 
 
 
 
 
 
 
 
 
 
 
 

Etymologies
Interjections
Profanity 
Sexual slang
Portuguese words and phrases